Fu Hong (284–350), originally named Pu Hong, courtesy name Guangshi, was the father of founding emperor of the Former Qin dynasty, Fu Jiàn (Emperor Jingmimg). In 350, Fu Hong proclaimed himself the Prince of Three Qins, receiving a prophecy willed him to become King. In the same year, he was poisoned by his subordinate Ma Qiu, who was then executed by Fu Jiàn, who took over Fu Hong's army. He was posthumously honored as the Emperor Huiwu of (Former) Qin with the temple name Taizu (太祖).

References

Former Qin people
Later Zhao people
Jin dynasty (266–420) people
284 births
350 deaths
Later Zhao generals
Former Zhao generals
Founding monarchs